This article lists diplomatic missions resident in Germany. At present, Germany hosts 159 embassies.

Since the reunification of Germany in 1990, and the decision of the federal parliament to move the capital from Bonn to Berlin in 1991, all countries that maintain resident embassies in Germany have moved to Berlin. Nonetheless, a few countries still maintain resident missions in Bonn, which serve as extension offices of their embassies.  Several countries have consulates/consulates general in major cities, namely Frankfurt, Düsseldorf, Hamburg, Munich, and Stuttgart.

This listing excludes honorary consulates.

Diplomatic missions in Berlin

Other missions or representative offices in Berlin
 (Representative office)
 (Permanent Representation)
 (Delegation)
 (Representative Office)
 (General Delegation)
 (Representative office)
 National Coalition for Syrian Revolution and Opposition Forces (Liaison office)
 (Representative office)

Embassy branch offices in Bonn

Consular missions

Bonn

 (Consulate-General)
 (Consulate)
 (Consulate-General)
 (Consulate-General)
 (Consulate-General)

Cologne

Dortmund
 (Consulate)

Dresden

Düsseldorf

 (Consulate)

Essen

Flensburg

Frankfurt

 (Consulate)

 (Consular agency)
 (Consulate)
 (Consulate)

 (Consulate)

Freiburg
 (Consulate)

Hamburg

Hannover

Karlsruhe

Leipzig

Mainz

Munich

 (Consulate-General)

 (Consulate)

Münster

Nuremberg

Saarbrücken

Stuttgart

 (Consulate)

 (Consulate)

Wolfsburg
 (Consular agency)

Accredited non-resident embassies

Resident in Brussels, Belgium

Resident in London, United Kingdom

Other Resident Cities

 (Paris)
 (Paris)
 (Washington, D.C.)
 (Singapore)
 (San Marino)
 (Paris)
 (The Hague)

Closed missions

See also
 Foreign relations of Germany
 List of diplomatic missions of Germany
 Visa requirements for German citizens

Notes

References

Germany Diplomatic List

 
Diplomatic
Germany